Qiwñuyu (Aymara qiwña a kind of tree (polylepis), uyu corral, "qiwña corral", also spelled Keunuyo, Keuñuyo) is a  mountain in the Andes of Bolivia. It is situated in the La Paz Department, José Manuel Pando Province, Catacora Municipality. The Junt'uni Jawira originates at the mountain. It flows to the southeast.

References 

Mountains of La Paz Department (Bolivia)